August F. Marquardt (January 8, 1850 – January 17, 1920) was an American businessman and politician.

Born in Bandekow, Pomerania, Germany, Marquardt emgranted with his family to the United States in 1866 and settled in Wausau, Wisconsin. Marquardt was in the logging and lumber business. He was also in the banking business. In 1883, Marquardt was elected to the Wausau Common Council. He also served on the city park and water commissions. In 1900, he was elected Sheriff of Marathon County, Wisconsin and was a Republican. From 1905 to 1909, he served in the Wisconsin State Assembly.

He died at his home in Wausau on January 17, 1920.

References

1850 births
1920 deaths
German emigrants to the United States
Politicians from Wausau, Wisconsin
Businesspeople from Wisconsin
Wisconsin city council members
Wisconsin sheriffs
Republican Party members of the Wisconsin State Assembly